990 may refer to:
 Year 990
 EgyptAir Flight 990
 Form 990, "Return of Organization Exempt From Income Tax," a form from the Internal Revenue Service of the United States
 List of highways numbered 990
 990 AM - the frequency of some radio stations